Chang Kow-lung (born 1938) is a Taiwanese environmentalist who served as the Minister of the Environmental Protection Administration between 2005 and 2007.

Education and activism
Chang graduated from Yale University in 1968 with a Ph.D. in physics. He then taught at National Taiwan University starting in 1976 and participated in Taiwan's environmental movement beginning in the 1980s. In 1988, Chang founded a magazine, New Environment. Shortly afterwards, in 1990, he launched the Taiwan Environmental Protection Union. That year, he became a secretary in the Taipei City Government, where he worked for ten years. In 2000, Chang was named vice minister of examinations.

A noted anti-nuclear activist, Chang has served as spokesman for the Nuke-4 Referendum Initiative Association.

Environmental Protection Administration
Premier Frank Hsieh appointed Chang Kow-lung head of the Environmental Protection Administration on 8 June 2005. That August, Chang announced a three-year plan to clean up the polluted Tamsui River. The next month, Chang ordered sanitation companies to stop gathering kitchen waste to use as a component in pig feed, after discussions with the Council of Agriculture. He also worked to pass laws regarding greenhouse gas emissions, later starting a global warming awareness initiative. Chang supported implementation of an ecotax for Taiwanese factories in 2006. However, the next year, environmentalist Robin Winkler claimed that the EPA favored industry over the environment. Chang then tried to sue Winkler for slandering the EPA. Chang resigned his position in May 2007, and was replaced by Winston Dang in June.

References

1938 births
Living people
Politicians of the Republic of China on Taiwan from Taipei
Taiwanese environmentalists
Taiwanese anti–nuclear power activists
Yale Graduate School of Arts and Sciences alumni
Taiwanese Ministers of Environment